Rough Rock Community School, Inc. (RRCS) is a tribal K-12 school in Rough Rock, Arizona, with a Chinle postal address. Operated by the Navajo Nation, it is funded by the Bureau of Indian Education (BIE). As of 2011, the school had approximately 440 day and residential students. These include 166 high school students in grades 9 through 12.

History
Founded by Robert Roessel Sr. and Ruth Roessel (Navajo), the school opened in 1966 as the Rough Rock Demonstration School (RRDS). 

In response to Native American activists' efforts to take control of their children's educations, that was the first school for which the Bureau of Indian Affairs (BIA) contracted with a tribal nation to operate it; the Navajo Nation were the first to operate a BIA school. The Navajo changed the curriculum to reflect their own culture, history, and traditions, or code of ethics, in addition to general academic coursework related to United States culture and other topics. 

In 1994 Rough Rock incorporated as a nonprofit and changed its name to Community School, as it was not a demonstration school anymore.

Construction
In the early 21st century, projects were constructed to replace BIA facilities at the school. A  K–8 dormitory with capacity for 86 students was built in 2010. A new K–8 academic building, and two additional dormitories were built in 2011. The project was the first replacement school project funded by the American Recovery and Reinvestment Act of 2009.

References

Further reading
  - Profile page at ERIC
  - Profile page at ERIC
  - Profile at ERIC (#ED024497)

Public high schools in Arizona
Educational institutions established in 1966
Native American schools in Arizona
Education on the Navajo Nation
Public elementary schools in Arizona
Public middle schools in Arizona
Public K-12 schools in the United States
Schools in Apache County, Arizona
Public boarding schools in the United States
Boarding schools in Arizona
Native American boarding schools